Stanford-le-Hope railway station is on a loop line of the London, Tilbury and Southend line, serving the town of Stanford-le-Hope, Essex. Its three-letter station code is SFO.

The station and all trains serving it are operated by c2c.

Nearby DP World London Gateway, while principally a deep-water port, is also a rail cargo terminus.

Services
The typical off-peak service consists of:
2 trains per hour (tph) to London Fenchurch Street via ;
2 tph to Southend Central.

History 
The station was opened on the London, Tilbury and Southend Railway in September 1854 with the name Horndon. Trains from London terminated at Stanford-le-Hope until the next section of railway to the east opened a year later. The original station building and up platform were constructed to the north of the London Road level crossing. The station was rebuilt during the 1960s immediately south of London Road by British Rail. The former station site is now the car park.

References

External links

Railway stations in Essex
DfT Category D stations
Transport in Thurrock
Former London, Tilbury and Southend Railway stations
Railway stations in Great Britain opened in 1854
Railway stations served by c2c